Carl Alberg (11 April 1901 – 31 August 1986)  was a Swedish born naval architect known for his influence in early fiberglass boats.

Career 

Alberg moved to the United States in 1925 where he began working as a rigger then later as a spar maker. Alberg was then hired by John Alden as a designer.

His successful career and current fame as a designer however can be linked back to his partnership with Pearson Yachts and early fiberglass yacht construction.  Their first collaboration was the Pearson Triton, a 28 foot fiberglass yacht which today is still frequently seen sailing oceans around the world.  Alberg later designed several other models for Pearson yachts. He also designed the first model for Bristol yachts.

One of his most famous and popular designs is also one of his earliest, the Alberg 30 which was built by Whitby Boatworks in Canada as a one design club racer. This boat had a record breaking production run of over 750 boats spanning 22 years and proved a good platform for ocean cruising.

Another successful partnership was with Cape Dory Yachts who produced 10 different models designed by Alberg.

Designs

Alberg's boat designs include:
Malabar Junior - 1935
Coastwise Crusier - 1938
Hinckley 21 - 1946
US One-Design - 1946
Pearson Triton - 1958
Sea Sprite 23 - 1958
Odyssey 30 - 1960
Pearson Electra - 1960
Alberg 35 - 1961
Hawk 16 - 1961
Alberg 30 - 1962
Arial 26 - 1962
Pearson Ensign - 1962
Douglas 22 - 1963
North American 22 - 1963
Commander 26 - 1964
Jouet Triton - 1965
South Coast 21 - 1965
South Coast 23 - 1965
Bristol 19 - 1966
Bristol 27 - 1966
Corinthian 19 - 1966
Kittiwake 23 - 1966
Alberg 37 - 1967
South Coast 22 - 1968
Alberg 22 - 1970
Alberg 23 - 1970
Cape Dory 28 - 1974
Typhoon 18 - 1974
Alberg 29 - 1976
Cape Dory 30C - 1976
Cape Dory 30K - 1976
Cape Dory 27 - 1977
Cape Dory 36 - 1978
Eclipse 6.7 - 1978
Cape Dory 33 - 1980
Cape Dory 22 - 1981
Cape Dory 25D - 1981
Cape Dory 45 - 1982
Cape Dory 31 - 1983
Alberg 34 - 1984
Cape Dory 26 - 1984
Cape Dory 40 - 1984
Typhoon Senior - 1984
Cape Dory 330 - 1985
Cape Dory 32 - 1986
Robinhood 36 - 1992
Robinhood 40 - 1996

External links 

 Carl Alberg's bio and list of designs at sailboat.guide
 Lists of boats designed by Carl Alberg

References

Swedish yacht designers
1986 deaths
1901 births